Liu Zuan may refer to:

Liu Zuan (劉纘), Emperor Zhi of Han
Liu Zuan (Three Kingdoms) (劉纂), a subject of Eastern Wu during the Three Kingdoms period